Gierzwałd  is a village in Ostróda County, Warmian-Masurian Voivodeship, in northern Poland. It is the seat of the gmina (administrative district) called Gmina Grunwald.

The village has a population of 638.

References

Villages in Ostróda County